Hollandia may refer to:

 HVV Hollandia, Dutch football team
 Hollandia Victoria Combinatie, defunct Dutch football team
 Hollandia (1742 ship), a ship of the Dutch East India Company, wrecked in 1743 on her maiden voyage
 Jayapura, a city in Indonesia, known as Hollandia from 1910 to 1962
 Sentani Airport, the city's airport, formerly known as Hollandia Airfield Complex
 Battle of Hollandia, 1944 battle between American and Japanese forces during World War II
 Landing at Hollandia, a battle of the Western New Guinea campaign of World War II in April 1944
 Hollandia Hut, Swiss Alpine Club hut
 Hollandia Roeiclub, Dutch rowing club
 Hollandia (moth)
 Hollandia beer, Dutch lager made by Bavaria Brewery (Netherlands)

See also 

 Holandia (disambiguation)
 Holland (disambiguation)